Han Fei (233), also known as Han Feizi or Han Fei Zi, was a Chinese philosopher or statesman of the "Legalist" (Fajia) school during the Warring States period, and a prince of the state of Han.

Han Fei is often considered to be the greatest representative of "Chinese Legalism" for his eponymous work the Han Feizi, synthesizing the methods of his predecessors. Han Fei's ideas are sometimes compared with those of Niccolò Machiavelli, author of The Prince. Zhuge Liang is said to have attached great importance to the Han Feizi, as well as Shen Buhai. 

Sima Qian recounts that Qin Shi Huang even went to war with the neighboring state of Han to obtain an audience with Han Fei, but was ultimately convinced to imprison him, whereupon he commits suicide. After the early demise of the Qin dynasty, the "Legalist" school became officially vilified by the following Han dynasty. Despite its outcast status throughout the history of imperial China, Han Fei's political theory and the "Legalist" school continued to heavily influence every dynasty thereafter, and the Confucian ideal of a rule without laws was never to be realised.

Han Fei borrowed Shang Yang's emphasis on laws, Shen Buhai's emphasis on administrative technique, and Shen Dao's ideas on authority and prophecy, emphasizing that the autocrat will be able to achieve firm control over the state with the mastering of his predecessors' methodologies: his position of power (勢; Shì), technique (術; Shù), and law (法; Fǎ). He stressed the importance of the concept of Xing-Ming (holding actual outcome accountable to speech), coupled with the system of the "Two Handles" (punishment and reward), as well as Wu wei (non-exertion).

Names
The pinyin transcription of the modern Mandarin pronunciation of the name is Hán Fēi (IPA: //). He is also known respectfully as Hanzi ("Master Han") or as Han Feizi ("Master Han Fei"). In Wade-Giles transcription, the same name was written Han Tzu, Han-tzu, Han Fei Tzu, or Han Fei-tzu. The same namesometimes as "the Hanfeizi" or "the Han-fei-tzu"is used to denote the later book whose contents are traditionally attributed to him.

Life
The exact year of Han Fei's birth remains unknown, however, scholars have placed it at around 280 BCE.

Unlike the other famed philosophers of the time, Han Fei was a member of the ruling aristocracy, having been born into the ruling family of the State of Han during the end phase of the Warring States period. In this context, his works have been interpreted by some scholars as being directed to his cousin, the King of Han. Sima Qian's Shi Ji says that Han Fei studied together with future Qin chancellor Li Si under the Confucian philosopher Xunzi.  It is said that because of his stutter, Han Fei could not properly present his ideas in court. His advice otherwise being ignored, but observing the slow decline of his Han state, he developed "one of the most brilliant (writing) styles in ancient China."

Sima Qian's biography of Han Fei is as follows: 

His works ultimately ended up in the hands of the thrilled Qin king, Ying Zheng, who commented, "If I can make friends with this person [Han Fei], I may die without regrets." and invited Han Fei to the Qin court. Han Fei presented the essay "Preserving the Han" to ask the king not to attack his homeland, but his ex-friend and rival Li Si used that essay to have Han Fei imprisoned on account of his likely loyalty to Han. Han Fei responded by writing another essay named "In the first time of meeting Qin king", hoping to use his writing talent to win the king's heart. Han Fei did win the king's heart, but not before Li Si forced him to commit suicide by drinking poison. The Qin king afterward regretted Han Fei's death.

Xunzi formed the hypothesis that human nature is evil and virtueless, therefore suggesting that human infants must be brought to their virtuous form through social-class-oriented Confucian moral education. Without such, Xunzi argued, man would act virtueless and be steered by his own human nature to commit immoral acts. Han Fei's education and life experience during the Warring States period, and in his own Han state, contributed his synthesis of a philosophy for the management of an amoral and interest-driven administration, to which morality seemed a loose and inefficient tool. Han agreed with his teacher's theory of "virtueless by birth", but as in previous "Legalist" philosophy, pragmatically proposed to steer people by their own interest-driven nature.

Notes

 Watson, Burton, Han Fei Tzu: Basic Writings. 1964, p. 2.  The king in question is believed to be either King An (238–230 BC) or his predecessor, King Huanhui (272–239 BC).

References

Further reading
 Burton Watson (1964). Han Fei Tzu: Basic Writings. New York: Columbia University Press. .
 Hàn Phi Tử, Vietnamese translation by Phan Ngọc, Nhà xuất bản Văn học, HCMC 2011.

External links

 The complete works of Han Fei Tzu, A classic of Chinese political science. Translator, Wenkui Liao.
 
 
 Li, Guangcan, "Han Fei Quotes". Encyclopedia of China (Law Edition), 1st ed.
 Gu, Fang, "Han Fei  Life Quotes". Encyclopedia of China (Philosophy Edition), 1st ed.
 Full text of Han Feizi
 

280s BC births
233 BC deaths
3rd-century BC Chinese philosophers
Chinese reformers
Han (state)
Legalism (Chinese philosophy)
Philosophers from Henan
Philosophers of law
Political philosophers
Social philosophers
Writers from Henan
Zhou dynasty essayists
Zhou dynasty philosophers
Critics of Confucianism
Qin state people